Hyloconis wisteriae is a moth of the family Gracillariidae. It is known from the islands of Shikoku and Kyushu in Japan.

The wingspan is 5–6 mm.

The larvae feed as leaf miners on Wisteria floribunda. The mine is orthogenous, entirely flat, circular or elliptical in form and located on the lower surface of the leaf. The cocoon is white, orbicular and spun in the centre of the mine-cavity.

Both sexes of this species are known for their asymmetrical genitalia which sets them apart from all other species of the genus Hyloconis.

References

Lithocolletinae
Moths of Japan

Moths described in 1963
Taxa named by Tosio Kumata
Leaf miners